St Jude's Parish Church is a former Anglican church in Mount Pleasant, Swansea, Wales, UK, which closed in 2015 With its final service was held on the 8th of February, just a few months short of its centenary,.

The present building was designed by E. M. Bruce Vaughan, and built in the years 1913–1915, on the site of an earlier church constructed of galvanised iron. In 1924 a new daughter church was built at Townhill to serve the developing estates at this end of the parish. In 1937 the parish of St Nicholas Townhill was carved out of St Jude's to serve this area. In 2015 Both St Jude's and St Nicholas were merged to make The Benefice of Swansea St Nicholas on the Hill and St Jude in St Nicholas Church Townhill and St Judes's church closed.

References

External links 
 
 

Anglican church buildings in Wales
Saint Jude's Church